Emigration from Uruguay is a migratory phenomenon that has been taking place in Uruguay since the early 20th century.

Overview
Emigration from Uruguay began tentatively about a century ago, but experienced a significant increase since the 1960s. Successive economic crises (notably in 1982 and 2002), plus the small size of the country's economy and population, were decisive factors that pushed thousands of Uruguayans out of their country of birth; economic migrants traveled primarily to other Spanish-speaking countries with bigger economies. As Uruguay has a relatively well-developed educational system and free access to the University of the Republic, many Uruguayan professional graduates and scholars found their country too small to achieve their own goals, which resulted in a brain drain. The 12-year-long military dictatorship that ruled from 1973 to 1985 also forced many Uruguayans to go into exile due to ideological differences and political persecution, in the context of the Cold War.

Destinations
The main receptors of Uruguayan emigration are: Argentina, Brazil, the United States, Canada, Australia; in Europe: Spain (over 40,000 as of 2011), Italy, France, and Portugal. During the military dictatorship, some exiled Uruguayans migrated to Mexico, Venezuela, Sweden, Germany, etc. Further, a significant number of Uruguayan Jews (almost 10,000) emigrated to Israel between 1950 and 2000 as part of the Aliyah.

Recent estimates put the emigration figures at over 500,000.

Articulation
At the beginning of the 21st century, Departamento 20 ("Twentieth Department", in allusion to the 19 Departments into which the Uruguayan territory is divided) was created, an instance of coordination and articulation for Uruguayans living abroad.

The Consultative Councils are representative organizations of Uruguayans living abroad whose central role is linking them with the country in several forms; they were established by Law No. 18250 of January 2008. They can be found in Argentina, Australia, Brazil, Canada, Chile, France, Greece, Italy, Mexico, Paraguay, Spain, Sweden, USA, and Venezuela.

As of November 2013, the Uruguayan government plans to implement a project to link qualified Uruguayan émigrés with technological sectors in Uruguay, especially in biotechnology, information technology and renewable energies.

Notable Uruguayan emigrants
Many talented Uruguayans have succeeded on the international stage:
Carlos Aragone (Montevideo, 1937 – Caracas, 1994), physicist
 Jorge Drexler (born 1964 in Montevideo), musician, 2004 Best Song Academy Award for Al otro lado del río
 Fernando Espuelas (born 1967 in Montevideo), American entrepreneur
 Elio García-Austt (Montevideo, 1919 - 2005), physician and neuroscientist, active in Chile and Spain 
 Natalia Oreiro (born 1977 in Montevideo), film and telenovela actress and singer, active in Argentina
 Carlos Ott (born 1946 in Montevideo), architect established in Canada, author of the Opéra Bastille, Paris (1989)
 Ángel Rama (Montevideo, 1926 – Madrid, 1983), writer, academic, literary critic, known for his theorization of the concept of transculturation
 Emir Rodríguez Monegal (Melo, 1921 – New Haven, 1985), was a scholar, literary critic, and professor of Latin American contemporary literature at Yale University 
 Rafael Viñoly (born 1944 in Montevideo), architect established in the United States, author of the Tokyo International Forum (1996)
 José Holebas (born 1984 in Aschaffenburg), Greek international footballer of Uruguayan descent through his mother.

See also

Demographics of Uruguay
Foreign relations of Uruguay
Immigration to Uruguay
Uruguayan people

References

Demographics of Uruguay
Emigration